John Snetzler (or Schnetzler) was an organ builder of Swiss origin, who worked mostly in England. Born in Schaffhausen in 1710, he trained with the firm of Egedacher in Passau and came to London about 1741. When he retired in 1781, his business continued and ended up with Thomas Elliot. Snetzler died in Schaffhausen on 28 September 1785.

List of works
Clare College, Cambridge has a functioning chamber organ by John Snetzler (1755) acquired from John Bibby of Winchester in 1985 and restored in 2016. It had been in the Mission Church of St James, Heysham, and before that in the collection of a 19th-century musicologist, J Fuller Maitland, of Borwick Hall, Lancashire. At one time it was in Shaw House, Berkshire.
Belle Skinner Collection, Yale University, New Haven, Connecticut, 1742 (restored 1983 by Noel Mander)
Smithsonian Institution, Washington, DC. https://americanhistory.si.edu/collections/search/object/nmah_606035
St Saviour's Chapel, Cathedral of the Holy and Undivided Trinity, Norwich, Norfolk 1745
St Andrew's Qualified Chapel, Carrubbers' Close, Edinburgh 1747, now in University of Glasgow Concert Hall
Fulneck Moravian Church, Leeds 1748
St Margaret's, King's Lynn 1754
St Paul's Church, Sheffield 1755
St Nicholas's Church, Whitehaven 1755 – removed to Arlecdon Church in 1904, where it survives in a heavily altered state.
St Leonard's Church, Swithland, Leicestershire, 1756
Duke of Bedford's musical gallery 1756, now St Mary the Virgin, Hillington, Norfolk
Holy Trinity Church, Hull (now Hull Minster) 1756 and 1758
Chapel of St John, St John Street, Edinburgh, 1757; the organ purchased by Lodge Canongate Kilwinning No2, is featured in a picture of Burns being made Poet Laureate of the lodge. It is still in regular, hand-pumped use.
Buckingham Palace 1760, now Eton College Chapel
Buckingham Palace 1760, now Chapel Royal, St James's Palace
Unitarian Church, Hastings, 1760 (restored 2010 by Matthew Copley) BA
The New Room, Bristol 1761 (installed around 1930, previously elsewhere)
Congregational Church of South Dennis, Massachusetts, United States, built in 1762, installed in 1854
Concert Hall (Boston, Massachusetts), 1763–1774
St Laurence Church, Ludlow, Shropshire, 1764
Peterhouse, Cambridge 1765
Halifax Parish Church 1766 (William Herschel first organist)
Octagon Chapel, Bath 1767 (William Herschel first organist)
St Michael's Episcopal Church, Charleston, South Carolina, USA 1768 (Case only; new organ 1994 by Kenneth Jones of Bray, Ireland)*Beverley Minster 1769
St Malachy's Parish Church, Hillsborough, County Down 1772–1773
Leicester Cathedral 1774 (Modified 1873 and 1930, some pipework remains)
National Museum Cardiff 1774, given by Watkin Williams-Wynn
St Mary's Church, Nottingham 1777
Rotherham Minster 1777
St Anne's Parish Church, Belfast 1781
St Mary and All Saints Church, Sculthorpe, Norfolk
Church of St Andrew, Blickling, Norfolk
Church of St Mary and All Saints, Chesterfield (1756, destroyed by fire 1961)

Sources
National Pipe Organ Register (NPOR) at the British Institute of Organ Studies
The Organ, William Leslie Sumner

References

Swiss pipe organ builders
Swiss-German people
Organ builders of the United Kingdom
1710 births
1785 deaths
People from Schaffhausen